The Trident Nariman Point is a luxury hotel on Marine Drive in Nariman Point, Mumbai, India. It is owned and operated by the Trident Hotels division of The Oberoi Group. 

It have 35 floors, on completion in 1973, it was the tallest building in South Asia, surpassing the  Express Towers, located next door.  It stayed the tallest building in South Asia until 1980, when Phiroze Jeejeebhoy Towers were completed.

History
The hotel opened on 7 April 1973 as the Oberoi-Sheraton Hotel. It was built by Mohan Singh Oberoi, at a cost of 180 million Rupees, as a joint venture between his Oberoi Hotels and US-based Sheraton Hotels, which had an equity interest of $500,000. Oberoi paid Sheraton a fee of $150 per room per year to manage the hotel, but this gave him access to an international reservations and marketing system, and also allowed him to qualify for a 43.5 million Rupee loan from the United States Agency for International Development. The loan was contingent on Oberoi accepting four American directors onto his board. As the Americans could not be present at meetings, they were represented by local stand-ins. The hotel showed a profit of 450,000 Rupees in 1974, and by 1978 annual profits were 29.4 million Rupees.

In 1978, Sheraton signed a marketing agreement with ITC to represent the properties of their WelcomHotels division, located across India. Oberoi angrily called it a "breach of an agreement both in letter and in spirit". In addition, Sheraton demanded that the annual fee Oberoi paid be doubled to $300 per room per year, and that the new 200-room wing of the hotel that was then under construction (today known as The Oberoi Mumbai) be covered at the same higher rate. Oberoi severed the joint venture with Sheraton and the hotel was renamed The Oberoi Towers on 5 March 1979,. The hotel was renamed Hilton Towers Mumbai on 5 April 2004, as part of a marketing alliance between Oberoi and Hilton Hotels. It was renamed Trident Nariman Point on 1 April 2008, when the alliance with Hilton ended.

On the night of 26 November 2008, a series of terrorist attacks in Mumbai was launched, including an attack on the hotel. Two terrorists, Abdul Rehman alias Abdul Rehman Chhota and Fahadullah alias Abu Fahad, entered the hotel and fired on guests. They took over 143 people hostage and killed at least 32 people during the ensuing 3-day siege. The National Security Guard arrived on 27 November, and on 28 November, the terrorists were shot dead by NSG, ending the crisis at the hotel.

References

External links
 Official website

Skyscraper hotels in Mumbai
Hotel buildings completed in 1973
Hotels established in 1973
2008 Mumbai attacks